Belle Collective is an American reality television series. The series premiered on Oprah Winfrey Network on January 15, 2021. The show follows the lives of five businesswomen in Jackson, Mississippi.

Cast 

The businesswomen in the show are:

 Tambra Cherie (season 1-)
 Dr. Antoinette Liles (season 1)
 Latrice Rogers (season 1-)
 Lateshia Pearson (season 1-)
 Marie Hamilton-Abston (season 1-)
 Aikisha Holly Colon (season 2-)
 So Gucci Williams (season 2-)

Episodes

References

External links 
 

2021 American television series debuts
Oprah Winfrey Network original programming
English-language television shows
2020s American reality television series